Panindícuaro is a town and seat of the municipality of Panindícuaro, in the central Mexican state of Michoacán. As of 2010, the town had a population of 5,565. It is the birth place of the painter Arturo Estrada Hernández.

References

Populated places in Michoacán